is a Japanese manga series written and illustrated by Satoshi Mizukami. It was serialized in Shōnen Gahōsha's Young King OURs magazine from May 2012 to March 2016. The manga received a digital simulpub release by Crunchyroll Manga, while Seven Seas Entertainment licensed the series for a print release.

Plot 
Fuuta Okeya is a high school student who can see ghosts and has a strange mark on his cheek that he hides. When Kouko Ishigami, a new student, arrives in his class with a scar on her forehead and accompanied by a ghost named East, Fuuta's tranquillity ends. After a failed attempt by Fuuta to make friends with Kouko and after she sees his mark, Kouko declares him to be her enemy, attacking him with a mysterious spiritual circle made of flames. The hostilities between the two date back to their reincarnation, and Fuuta will have to discover his past and his links with Kouko, East, and Rune, the spirit of a girl who suddenly appears.

Characters 
 
 The protagonist of the story, a fourteen-year-old with the ability to see and communicate with ghosts.
 
 Fuuta's deadly enemy. She recovered her past life's memory after a car accident that left a scar on her forehead.

Reception 
Spirit Circle was nominated for the 48th Seiun Award in the comic category in 2017.

Notes

External links
 

2012 manga
Science fantasy anime and manga
Seinen manga
Seven Seas Entertainment titles
Shōnen Gahōsha manga
Supernatural anime and manga